Walnut Township is one of the thirteen townships of Fairfield County, Ohio, United States. As of the 2010 census the population was 6,841, of whom 4,789 lived in the unincorporated portions of the township.

Geography
Located in the northeastern corner of the county, it borders the following townships:
Union Township, Licking County - north
Thorn Township, Perry County - east
Richland Township - southeast
Pleasant Township - south
Liberty Township - west
Harrison Township, Licking County - northwest corner

Several populated places are located in Walnut Township:
Part of the village of Buckeye Lake, in the far north
The census-designated place of Fairfield Beach, in the northeast
The village of Millersport, in the north
Part of the village of Pleasantville, in the far south
The village of Thurston, in the south

Name and history
Walnut Township was organized in 1807, and named for the groves of walnut trees within its borders. Statewide, other Walnut Townships are located in Gallia and Pickaway counties.

Government
The township is governed by a three-member board of trustees, who are elected in November of odd-numbered years to a four-year term beginning on the following January 1. Two are elected in the year after the presidential election and one is elected in the year before it. There is also an elected township fiscal officer, who serves a four-year term beginning on April 1 of the year after the election, which is held in November of the year before the presidential election. Vacancies in the fiscal officership or on the board of trustees are filled by the remaining trustees.

References

External links
Walnut Township official website
County website

Townships in Fairfield County, Ohio
Townships in Ohio